The Ballarat Showgrounds (officially Ballarat Showgrounds and Recreation Reserve) is a multi-purpose venue in Wendouree, a suburb of Ballarat, Victoria, Australia, owned by the City of Ballarat and since 1934, the home of the Ballarat Show and agricultural show (an official public holiday in Ballarat).

The focus of the Ballarat Show is the display of rural industry, including livestock and produce, with associated competitions and awards. The show also features amusement rides, a sideshow alley and showbags, which are carry-bags full of novelties and sweet-treats produced by various commercial enterprises.

The facilities are used all year round for Trash and Treasure market (since 1979) as well as occasional collectors markets, show and shine displays and other events.

In 2013-2014, the City of Ballarat initially proposed to redevelop the showgrounds, and in 2015 the council and agricultural society further proposed relocation of the showgrounds to Victoria Park in Newington. During the state election of 2014, the Andrews Government committed $5.5 million (AUD) toward the development of the showgrounds. In 2017 the Agricultural Society in consultation with the Ballarat Council agreed that the existing showgrounds would be redeveloped and proceeds from the sale of the existing land coupled with monies committed from the state government would be used to develop a newer and larger facility at a greenfield site 3 km north of the existing site by 2022.

Site

The  site includes Eureka Stadium, which hosts Australian rules football and a number of other display areas and enclosed pavilions.

There are a number of sealed roads servicing the site which are used as pedestrian thoroughfares during the show. The main entrance is located at the corner of Creswick Road and Howitt Streets.

The main thoroughfare is Beggs Avenue which runs diagonally across the site and feeds into Bolte Place and most of the animal displays. On the northern flank of Beggs Avenue is where the majority of sideshow rides are normally placed. Whykes Street is the other main road and feeds along the southern border of the site. This roadway contains the Howitt Street Pavilion which is used as a permanent market stall shed throughout the year and is used during the show partly for the sideshow alley and to house static displays.

There are a number of large permanent pavilions built throughout the grounds which house merchandise stalls, show animals, static, craft and machinery displays.

History
The Ballarat Agricultural and Pastoral Society was formed in 1856 and based in Learmonth. The first agricultural show in Ballarat city was held in 1859. In 1861 the society's showgrounds site was relocated to Lake Wendouree on the North East flank of the lake in an area bounded by Wendouree Parade, Burnbank and Gregory Streets. In 1934 the present site was chosen at the corner of Howitt Street and Creswick Road, Wendouree with all annual shows being held at this location ever since.

Following World War 2, a number of surplus 'P huts' and buildings were relocated from the former Ballarat RAAF Base's Wireless and Air Gunnery School for use as administration buildings and pavilions. Many of those buildings remain in use today.

The arena became the home of the Ballarat and District Trotting Club (the oldest harness racing club in Australia) and regularly hosted meetings between 14 April 1952 to December 1965. The Ballarat and District Trotting Club subsequently and permanently relocated to a new purpose-built harness racing complex (Bray Raceway) in the Ballarat suburb of Redan in February 1966. The showgrounds trotting arena subsequently deteriorated and was finally dismantled in 1990, being replaced by the Eureka Stadium (now commercially known as Mars Stadium) and the North Ballarat Sports Club. A smaller grassed animal parade and display area was established between the new stadium and the existing showgrounds pavilions.

See also

Royal Melbourne Show
Royal Geelong Show

References

External links

Buildings and structures in Ballarat
Tourist attractions in Ballarat
Ballarat
Tourist attractions in Victoria (Australia)
Showgrounds in Australia